Brandwein is a surname. Notable people with the surname include:

Avraham Brandwein (died 2013), Israeli Kabbalah scholar
Naftule Brandwein (1884–1963), Jewish clarinetist and influential klezmer musician
Oded Brandwein (born 1988), Israeli-Polish professional basketball player in the Israeli Premier League

See also
Brandwein Nunataks

Jewish surnames
Yiddish-language surnames